The Soviet Negro Republic (also known as the Negro Soviet Republic) was a hypothetical future communist republic, proposed by some black communist activists in 1930s America. In 1945, the former leader of the Communist Party USA told the House Un-American Activities Committee that these proposals were not official party policy. During the 1960s, the far-right John Birch Society linked the burgeoning civil rights movement for Black Americans to plans for a "Soviet Negro Republic", claiming that the movement was a communist plot.

Origins 
The position of black Americans within the wider communist movement in America had been hotly debated for a while. Many communists favored the formation of an independent Soviet republic for black people as an oppressed ethnic group within the United States, influenced by Marcus Garvey's formulation of the Back-to-Africa movement. This was purportedly the line favored by Stalin and orthodox Leninists within the Soviet Union, but opposed by US party leaders and many black Americans within the communist movement opposed such as an example of Jim Crow-style segregation and white chauvinism, and unhelpful in alleviating the position of black people in America at that time.

A proposed communist republic within the "Black Belt" of the Southern United States was mentioned by James W. Ford and James S. Allen in The Negroes in a Soviet America (1935). Ruled by black people under the principle of self-determination, it was hypothesized that the proposed republic might later favor federation with a communist United States. The proposal drew criticism for the implication that blacks were not really American, and for the idea that all blacks in America be relocated there.

In 1945, former leader of the Communist Party USA, Earl Browder, told the House Un-American Activities Committee that official communist plans for a Soviet Negro Republic were false.

Use by  John Birch Society 

However, the far-right John Birch Society continued to claim that the African-American civil rights movement was a communist plot to found a Soviet Negro Republic with Martin Luther King as its president. Posters from the society promoting the claim were seen during the Barry Goldwater 1964 presidential campaign, supposedly disturbing Goldwater, who viewed the signs as racist. The California Eagle, an African-American newspaper, claimed that the campaign against King put the Society "out in the open as an active anti-Negro organization ... The Birchers are a little more subtle than the Klansmen but they are just as dangerous to our hopes for first class citizenship."

See also
 Black Belt in the American South

References 

1935 books
Anti-communism in the United States
Civil rights in the United States
Communist Party USA
John Birch Society
Proposed countries